The 1964 Cornell Big Red football team was an American football team that represented Cornell University during the 1964 NCAA University Division football season. Cornell tied for fifth in the Ivy League .

In its fourth season under head coach Tom Harp, the team compiled a 3–5–1 record but outscored opponents 196 to 139. Clarence Jentes was the team captain.

Cornell's 3–4 conference record tied for fifth place in the Ivy League standings. The Big Red outscored Ivy opponents 184 to 122.

Cornell played its home games at Schoellkopf Field in Ithaca, New York.

Schedule

References

Cornell
Cornell Big Red football seasons
Cornell Big Red football